The Spain national wheelchair handball team is the national wheelchair handball team of Spain and is controlled by the Royal Spanish Handball Federation.

History
The Spanish team played there first game on 31 October 2021 against Portugal in León. They lost the game 10–26 (Halftime 2–13).

On 1 and 2 July 2022 they participated at the 2022 Euro Hand 4 All a 4 nations friendly tournament in France. Against Belgium they were able to win there first game. The game for place 3 they won again against Belgium and secured the bronze medal.

They are participating at the first 2022 World and European Wheelchair Handball Championship in Portugal.

Competitive record

European Wheelchair Handball Nations’ Tournament
They did not participated at the European Wheelchair Handball Nations’ Tournament.

Wheelchair Handball World Championship

References

External links 
 website
 EHF Team Page

National wheelchair handball teams
Handball in Spain
National sports teams of Spain